Current and former female presidents or chancellors of co-ed colleges and universities are listed in order of the inaugural year.

United States
 Julia Sears, 1872–1873, Mankato Normal School (now Minnesota State University, Mankato) 
 Mary McLeod Bethune, 1923-1942 and 1946–1947, Bethune-Cookman University, Daytona Beach, FL
 Emma Elizabeth Johnson, 1925–1927, Johnson University (Kimberlin Heights, TN)
 Mary Elizabeth Branch, 1930–1944, Huston–Tillotson University (Austin, TX)
 Miriam Parker Schumacher, 1944–1967, Southwestern University (now Southwestern Law School)
 Isabel McKay, 1951–1965, Embry-Riddle Aeronautical Institute
 Dora E. Kirby, 1959–1977, Woodbury University
 Sr. Doris Smith, S.C., 1972–1992, College of Mount Saint Vincent
 Lorene Rogers, 1974–1979, The University of Texas at Austin
 Marjorie Downing Wagner, 1974–1976, Sonoma State College
 Barbara Uehling, 1978–1979, University of Missouri, and 1987–1994, University of California, Santa Barbara
 Hanna Holborn Gray, 1978–1993, University of Chicago
 Sister Thomas Welder, 1978–2009, University of Mary (formerly Mary College in Bismarck, North Dakota)
 Julia M. McNamara, 1982–2016, Albertus Magnus College
 Janet Eisner, 1979–2022, Emmanuel College
 Sharon C. Diaz, 1982–2018, Samuel Merritt University
 Juliet V. García, 1986-1991, Texas Southmost College
 Diana Natalicio, 1988–2019, University of Texas at El Paso
 Donna Shalala, 1988–1993, University of Wisconsin-Madison
 Blenda J. Wilson, 1988-1992, University of Michigan - Dearborn; 1993-1999, California State University, Northridge
 Juliet V. García, 1991-2014, University of Texas at Brownsville
 Jahnae H. Barnett, 1990–2021, (co-ed from 1996), William Woods University
 Mary L. Smith, 1991–1998, Kentucky State University
 Jean A. Dowdall, 1993-1995, Simmons University (Boston, MA)
 Nannerl O. Keohane, 1993–2004, Duke University
 Sister M. Elise Kriss, 1993–2019, University of Saint Francis (Indiana)
 Karen W. Morse, 1993–2008, Western Washington University
 Donna M. Carroll, 1994–2021, Dominican University (River Forest, Illinois)
 Mary Sue Coleman, 1995–2002, University of Iowa
 Sandra Featherman, 1995–2006, University of New England
 Karen S. Haynes, 1995–2004, University of Houston-Victoria
 Paula M. Rooney, 1995–2022, Dean College
 Kathleen H. Geoppinger, 1995–present, Midwestern University
 Linda J. Kaminski, 1995–present, Yakima Valley College
 Jane O'Meara Sanders, 1996–1997, Goddard College, 2004–2011 Burlington College
 Portia Shields, 1996–2005, Albany State University
 Deborah F. Stanley, 1997–2021, State University of New York at Oswego
 Molly Corbett Broad, 1997–2006, University of North Carolina
 Davie Jane Gilmour, 1998–2022, Pennsylvania College of Technology
 Marye Anne Fox, 1998–2004, North Carolina State University; 2004–2012, University of California, San Diego
 Lisa Rossbacher, 1988-2014, Southern Polytechnic State University (Marietta, Georgia)
 Jennifer L. Braaten, 1999–2002, Midland Lutheran College, 2002–2016, Ferrum College, interim, 2017–2020, Blackburn College
 Shirley Ann Jackson, 1999–2022, Rensselaer Polytechnic Institute
 Pamela Brooks Gann, 1999–2013, Claremont McKenna College
 R. Barbara Gitenstein, 1999–2018, The College of New Jersey
 Jerilyn McIntyre, 2000-2009, Central Washington University
 Judy Genshaft, 2000–2019, University of South Florida
 Shirley C. Raines, 2001–2013, University of Memphis
 Ruth Simmons, 2001–2012, Brown University
 Donna Shalala, 2001–2015, University of Miami
 Shirley M. Tilghman, 2001–2013, Princeton University
 Mary Sue Coleman, 2002–2014, University of Michigan
Elaine Tuttle Hansen, 2002-2011, Bates College
 Karen A. Holbrook, 2002–2007, Ohio State University
 Kay Norton, 2002–2018, University of Northern Colorado
 Beverly Daniel Tatum, 2002–2015, Spelman College
 Denise Trauth, 2002–2022, Texas State University
 Nancy Cantor, 2004–2013, Syracuse University; 2014–present, Rutgers University
 Jo Ann M. Gora, 2004–2014, Ball State University
 Amy Gutmann, 2004–2022, University of Pennsylvania
 Karen S. Haynes, 2004–2019, California State University San Marcos
 Susan Hockfield, 2004–2012, Massachusetts Institute of Technology
 Sandra Kurtinitis, 2005–present, Community College of Baltimore County
 Zorica Pantic, 2005–2019, Wentworth Institute of Technology
 Denice Denton, 2005–2006, University of California, Santa Cruz
 Lou Anna Simon, 2005–2018, Michigan State University
 Susan C. Scrimshaw, 2006-2008, Simmons University (Boston, MA)
 Janet Cunningham, 2006–2022, Northwestern Oklahoma State University
 Maria Klawe, 2006–present, Harvey Mudd College
 Danielle N. Ripich, 2006–2017, University of New England
 Ann Weaver Hart, 2006–2012, Temple University; 2012–2017, University of Arizona
 Drew Gilpin Faust, 2007–2018, Harvard University
 Sally Mason, 2007–2015, University of Iowa
Gail Carberry, 2007–2017, Quinsigamond Community College
 Barbara Snyder, 2007–2020, Case Western Reserve University
 France Córdova, 2007–2012, Purdue University
 Virginia Hinshaw, 2007–2012, University of Hawaiʻi at Mānoa
 Judith A. Bense, 2008–2016, University of West Florida
 Margaret Drugovich, 2008–present, Hartwick College
 Helen G. Drinan, 2008-2020, Simmons University (Boston, MA)
 Linda P. Brady, 2008–2015, University of North Carolina at Greensboro
 Carolyn Martin, 2008–2011, University of Wisconsin-Madison; 2011–present, Amherst College
 Elsa A. Murano, 2008–2009, Texas A&M University
 Renu Khator, 2008–present, chancellor of the University of Houston System and president of the University of Houston
 Pamela Trotman Reid, 2008–2015, University of Saint Joseph
Paula Allen-Meares, 2009–2015, University of Illinois at Chicago
 Bernadette Gray-Little, 2009–2017, University of Kansas
 M. R. C. Greenwood, 2009–2013, University of Hawaiʻi System
 Linda Katehi, 2009–2016, University of California, Davis
Nancy L. Zimpher, 2009–2017, State University of New York System
Barbara Couture, 2010–present, New Mexico State University at Las Cruces
Waded Cruzado, 2010–present, Montana State University
Dana G. Hoyt, 2010–present, Sam Houston State University
Nivine Megahed, 2010–present, National Louis University
Carolyn Meyers, 2010–2016, Jackson State University
Mary Jane Saunders, 2010–2013, Florida Atlantic University
Teresa Sullivan, 2010–2018, University of Virginia
Regina Stanback Stroud, 2010–2019, Skyline College (San Bruno, CA) and 2019–present, Perlata Community College District
Sandra K. Woodley, 2010–present, University of Louisiana system
Cheryl Evans, 2011–present, Northern Oklahoma College
Susan Herbst, 2011–present, University of Connecticut
Carolyn Long, 2011–present, West Virginia University Institute of Technology
Mary Ellen Mazey, 2011–2017, Bowling Green State University
Joy McDaniel, 2011–present, Murray State College
Carol Quillen, 2011–present, Davidson College
Renée M. Wachter, 2011-present, University of Wisconsin-Superior
Angela L. Walker Franklin, 2011–present, Des Moines University
Phyllis Wise, 2011–2015, University of Illinois at Urbana–Champaign
Judy L. Bonner, 2012–2015, University of Alabama at Tuscaloosa
Jane C. Conoley, 2014–present, University of California, Long Beach
Cynthia Jackson Hammond, 2012–present, Central State University
Christina Paxson, 2012–present, Brown University
Dianne F. Harrison, 2012-2021, California State University, Northridge
Wendy Robinson, 2012–present, Helene Fuld College of Nursing
Cheryl B. Schrader, 2012–2017, Missouri University of Science and Technology 
Clayton Spencer, 2012–present, Bates College
Rebecca Blank, 2013–2022, University of Wisconsin-Madison and President-designate of Northwestern University
Barbara A. Farley, 2013–present, Illinois College
Carol Folt, 2013–2019, University of North Carolina at Chapel Hill
Morna K. Foy, 2013–present, Wisconsin Technical College System
Glenda Baskin Glover, 2013–present, Tennessee State University
Karen M. Scolforo, 2013–present, Central Penn College
Janet Napolitano, 2013–2020, University of California System
Jeanie Webb, 2013–present, Rose State College
Robin E. Bowen, 2014–present, Arkansas Tech University
Gwendolyn Boyd, 2014–2016, Alabama State University
Rebecca Chopp, 2014–present, University of Denver
Sheri Everts, 2014–present, Appalachian State University
Carine M. Feyten, 2014–present, Texas Woman's University
 Leigh Goodson, 2014–present, Tulsa Community College
 Elmira Mangum, 2014–2016, Florida A&M University
 Melody Rose, 2014–2018, Marylhurst University
 Lisa Rossbacher, 2014-2019, California State Polytechnic University, Humboldt
Colette Pierce Burnette, 2015–present, Huston–Tillotson University (Austin, TX)
 Ana Mari Cauce, 2015–present, University of Washington
 Kina Mallard, 2015–2020, Reinhardt University
 Jaquie Moloney, 2015–present, University of Massachusetts Lowell
 Andrea Lewis Miller, 2015–2019, LeMoyne-Owen College (Memphis, TN)
 Fayneese Miller, 2015–present, Hamline University (Saint Paul, Minnesota)
 Valerie Smith, 2015–present, Swarthmore College (Swarthmore, Pennsylvania)
 Marion Terenzio, 2015–present, State University of New York at Cobleskill
 Margaret H. Venable, 2015–present, Dalton State College (Dalton, Georgia)
 Erika D. Beck, 2016-2020, California State University, Channel Islands
 Laura Casamento, 2016–present, Utica College
 Soraya M. Coley, 2016–present, California State Polytechnic University, Pomona
 Gayle E. Hutchinson, 2016–present, California State University, Chico
 Karla Hughes, 2016–present, University of Arkansas at Monticello
Ellen Junn, 2016–present, California State University, Stanislaus
 Mary A. Papazian, 2016–2021, San Jose State University
Judy K. Sakaki, 2016-2022, Sonoma State University
 Claire E. Sterk, 2016–2020, Emory University
 Elissa Tenny, 2016–present, School of the Art Institute of Chicago
 Cynthia Kelley, 2016–present, Madisonville Community College, KCTCS
 Martha Dunagin Saunders, 2017–present, University of West Florida
 Sylvia Matthews Burwell, 2017–present, American University (Washington, D.C.)
Shirley M. Collado, 2017–present, Ithaca College
 Laurie Aleta Carter, 2017–present, Shippensburg University
 Lorrie Clemo, 2017-present, D'Youville University, Buffalo, NY 
 Beverly J. Davenport, 2017–2018, University of Tennessee
 Barbara Lettiere, 2017–present, Immaculata University
 Linda Livingstone, 2017–present, Baylor University
 Karol V. Mason, 2017–present, John Jay College of Criminal Justice
 Kelly M. Miller, 2017–present, Texas A&M University-Corpus Christi (Corpus Christi, Texas)
 Patricia Moulton, 2017–present, Vermont Technical College
 Katricia Pierson, 2017–present, East Central University
 Lana Reynolds, 2017–present, Seminole State College
 Cheryl B. Schrader, 2017–present, Wright State University (Fairborn, Ohio)
 G. Gabrielle Starr, 2017–present, Pomona College
Cynthia Warrick, 2017–present, Stillman College (Tuscaloosa, Alabama)
Wendy Wintersteen, 2017–present, Iowa State University
Alissa Young, 2017–present, Hopkinsville Community College (Hopkinsville, Kentucky)
Ora Hirsch Pescovitz, M.D., 2017–present, Oakland University (Rochester, Michigan)
 Carmen Twillie Ambar, 2018–present, Oberlin College (Oberlin, Ohio)
Roslyn Clark Artis, 2018–present, Benedict College (Columbia, SC)
 Irma Becerra, 2018–present, Marymount University(Arlington,VA)
 Neeli Bendapudi, 2018–present, University of Louisville (Louisville, Kentucky)
 Martha Burger, 2018–present, Oklahoma City University (Oklahoma City, Oklahoma)
 Cathie Cline, 2018–present, East Arkansas Community College (Forrest City, Arkansas)
 Marion Ross Fedrick, 2018–present, Albany State University (Albany, Georgia)
 Merodie A. Hancock, 2018–present, Thomas Edison State University (Trenton, New Jersey)
 Michelle R. Johnston, 2018–present, College of Coastal Georgia (Brunswick, Georgia)
Maud Mandel, 2018–present, Williams College (Williamstown, Massachusetts
Lily McNair, 2018–2021, Tuskegee University
Polly Peterson, 2018–present, Jamestown College (Jamestown, North Dakota)
Tania Tetlow, 2018-2022, Loyola University New Orleans
 Adela de la Torre, 2018–present, San Diego State University
 Astrid S. Tuminez, 2018–present, Utah Valley University (Orem, Utah)
 Ruth V. Watkins, 2018–present, University of Utah (Salt Lake City, Utah)
Lynnette Zelezny, 2018–present, California State University, Bakersfield
Paige Comstock Cunningham, 2019–present, Taylor University (Upland, IN)
Christina Drale, 2019–present, University of Arkansas Little Rock (Little Rock, Arkansas)
Marcheta P. Evans, 2019–present, Bloomfield College(Bloomfield, New Jersey)
 Carol Folt, 2019–present, University of Southern California
Joan T.A. Gabel, 2019–present, University of Minnesota (Minneapolis and Saint Paul, Minnesota)
Hilary L. Link, 2019—present, Allegheny College (Meadville, PA)
Sarah Mangelsdorf, 2019–present, University of Rochester (Rochester, New York)
Joyce McConnell, 2019–present, Colorado State University (Fort Collins, Colorado)
Wendy Raymond, 2019–present, Haverford College (Haverford, Pennsylvania)
Terisa C. Riley, 2019–present, University of Arkansas-Fort Smith (Fort Smith, Arkansas)
Lori S. White, 2020–present, DePauw University (Greencastle, Indiana)
Gilda Barabino, 2020–present, Olin College (Needham, Massachusetts)
Erika D. Beck, 2021–present, California State University, Northridge 
Anne F. Harris, 2020–present, Grinnell College (Grinnell, Iowa)
Kristina M. Johnson, 2020–present, Ohio State University (Columbus, OH)
Courtney Martin, 2020–present, Ohio Valley College of Technology(East Liverpool, Ohio)
Suzanne Rivera, 2020–present, Macalester College (Saint Paul, Minnesota)
Lynn Wooten, 2020–present, Simmons University (Boston, MA)
Lesia Crumpton-Young, 2021–present, Texas Southern University
Barbara J. Wilson, 2021–present, University of Iowa
Montserrat Fuentes, 2021–present, St Edwards University (Austin, Texas)
Terri Goss Kinzy, 2021–present, Illinois State University
Neeli Bendapudi, 2022–present, Penn State University
Jennifer Bonds-Raacke, 2022–present, Saint Martin's University (Lacey, Washington) 
Nora Demleitner, 2022–present, St. John's College - Annapolis
M. Elizabeth Magill, 2022–present, University of Pennsylvania
Jayathi Murthy, 2022–present, Oregon State University
Tania Tetlow, 2022–present, Fordham University (New York City, New York)
Sian Beilock, president-elect, Dartmouth College (Hanover, New Hampshire)
Susan Rundell Singer, president-elect, St. Olaf College (Northfield, Minnesota)
 Nemat (Minouche) Shafik, President-elect, Columbia University (New York City, New York)

Australia

Dianne Yerbury, 1987–2005, Macquarie University
Ingrid Moses, 1997–2006, University of New England

Janice Reid, 1998–2013, Western Sydney University

Margaret Gardner, 2005–2014, RMIT University; 2014–present, Monash University
Sandra Harding, 2007–2022, James Cook University
Annabelle Duncan, 2014–2019, University of New England
Margaret Sheil, 2018–present, Queensland University of Technology
Brigid Heywood, 2019–2022, University of New England
Deborah Terry, 2020-present, University of Queensland
Patricia M. Davidson, 2021–present, University of Wollongong
Harlene Hayne, 2021–present, Curtin University
Renée Leon, 2021–present, Charles Sturt University

Canada
 Pauline Mills McGibbon, 1971–1974, University of Toronto (Toronto, Ontario)
Eva Mader MacDonald, 1974–1977, University of Toronto (Toronto, Ontario)
Isabel Auld, 1977–1986, University of Manitoba (Winnipeg, Manitoba)
Naomi L. Hersom, 1986–1991, Mount St Vincent University (Halifax, Nova Scotia)
Rose Wolfe, 1991–1997, University of Toronto (Toronto, Ontario)
 Marie Smallface Marule, 1992–2014, Red Crow Community College (Kainai Nation, Alberta)
 Emőke Szathmáry, 1996–2008, University of Manitoba, (Winnipeg, Manitoba).
 Martha Piper, 1997–2006, University of British Columbia. (Vancouver, British Columbia)
 Heather Munroe-Blum, 2003–2013, McGill University (Montreal, Quebec)
 Suzanne Fortier, 2013–2022, McGill University (Montreal, Quebec)
 Indira Samarasekera, 2005–2015, University of Alberta (Edmonton, Alberta)
 M. Elizabeth Cannon, 2010–2018, University of Calgary (Calgary, Alberta)
D. Rose Patten, 2018–present, University of Toronto (Toronto, Ontario)
 Anne Mahon, 2019–present, University of Manitoba, (Winnipeg, Manitoba)

Ecuador
 Cecilia A. Paredes, 2017–present, Escuela Superior Politecnica del Litoral (Guayaquil)

New Zealand 

 Dawn Freshwater, 2020–present, University of Auckland
 Cheryl de la Rey, 2019–present, University of Canterbury
 Jan Thomas, 2018–present, Massey University

Philippines
 Rosita L. Navarro, 2001–2006, Centro Escolar University (Manila)

Turkey
 Gülsün Sağlamer, 1996–2004, Istanbul Technical University (Istanbul)
 Gülay Barbarosoğlu, 2012–2016, Boğaziçi University (Istanbul)

United Kingdom

Louise Richardson: 2009–2015, University of St Andrews; 2016–present, University of Oxford
Sally Mapstone: 2016–present, University of St Andrews
Elizabeth Treasure: 2017–present, Aberystwyth University
 Madeleine Atkins: 2018–present, Lucy Cavendish College, Cambridge University
 Candice McQueen: 2021–present, Lipscomb University

See also
List of current and historical women's universities and colleges in the United States
Timeline of women's colleges in the United States
Seven Sisters (colleges)

Notes

University Presidents

Lists of female office-holders
Education-related lists